Schiller Park is a station on Metra's North Central Service in Schiller Park, Illinois. In Metra's zone-based fare system, Schiller Park is in zone C. As of 2018, Schiller Park is the 214th busiest of Metra's 236 non-downtown stations, with an average of 41 weekday boardings. Schiller Park was opened on January 30, 2006, along with three other new stations on the North Central Service.

As of December 12, 2022, Schiller Park is served by 12 trains (six in each direction) on weekdays.

References

External links 

Station House from Google Maps Street View

Metra stations in Illinois
Railway stations in the United States opened in 2006
Railway stations in Cook County, Illinois
Former Soo Line stations